Morokulien is a six-hectare area on the border between Norway (municipality of Eidskog) and Sweden (Eda Municipality). The name Morokulien was coined in the radio program "Över alla gränser" sent from Morokulien in 1959 and has since stuck. It is made up from the Norwegian and the Swedish words for "fun" (moro and kul, respectively).

History
In 1910 the Nordic Peace Congress in Stockholm decided that a peace monument should be raised on the border between Sweden and Norway to celebrate 100 years of peace between the countries. The building of the peace monument was finished in 1914.

Amateur radio station
In 1968 Swedish and Norwegian radio amateurs decided to start an amateur radio station in a cottage on the border between Sweden and Norway. Unusually, it had both a Swedish (SJ9WL) and a Norwegian (LG5LG) call sign. The station is open for rent to all radio amateurs with an amateur radio license.

Local tourist office
The local tourist office is on the border between Norway and Sweden. The borderline divides it in two; the borderline has been marked on the roof and the floor. The border can be crossed without a passport.

External links
Amateur Radio In Morokulien
Morokulien Infocenter
Morokuliens official homepage

Station
Fictional European countries
Peace monuments and memorials
Tourist attractions in Hedmark
Tourist attractions in Värmland County